Reservoir engineering is a branch of petroleum engineering that applies scientific principles to the fluid flow through porous medium during the development and production of oil and gas reservoirs so as to obtain a high economic recovery. The working tools of the reservoir engineer are subsurface geology, applied mathematics, and the basic laws of physics and chemistry governing the behavior of liquid and vapor phases of crude oil, natural gas, and water in reservoir rock. Of particular interest to reservoir engineers is generating accurate reserves estimates for use in financial reporting to the SEC and other regulatory bodies. Other job responsibilities include numerical reservoir modeling, production forecasting, well testing, well drilling and workover planning, economic modeling, and PVT analysis of reservoir fluids. Reservoir engineers also play a central role in field development planning, recommending appropriate and cost effective reservoir depletion schemes such as waterflooding or gas injection to maximize hydrocarbon recovery. Due to legislative changes in many hydrocarbon producing countries, they are also involved in the design and implementation of carbon sequestration projects in order to minimise the emission of greenhouse gases.

Types 
Reservoir engineers often specialize in two areas:
 Surveillance engineering, i.e. monitoring of existing fields and optimization of production and injection rates.  Surveillance engineers typically use analytical and empirical techniques to perform their work, including decline curve analysis, material balance modeling, and inflow/outflow analysis.
 Dynamic modeling, i.e. the conduct of reservoir simulation studies to determine optimal development plans for oil and gas reservoirs.  Also, reservoir engineers perform and integrate well tests into their data for reservoirs in geothermal drilling.

See also 
Enhanced oil recovery
Flow Zone Unit
Fluid dynamics
Gas/oil ratio
Geothermal energy
Petroleum
Petroleum engineering
Petroleum geology
Reservoir simulation
Reservoir modelling

Notes

References
Craft, B.C. & Hawkins, M. Revised by Terry, R.E. 1990 "Applied Petroleum Reservoir Engineering" Second Edition (Prentice Hall).
Dake, L.P., 1978, "Fundamentals of Reservoir Engineering" (Elsevier)
Frick, Thomas C. 1962 "Petroleum Production Handbook, Vol II" (Society of Petroleum Engineers).
Slider, H.C. 1976 "Practical Petroleum Reservoir Engineering Methods" (The Petroleum Publishing Company).
Charles R. Smith, G. W. Tracy, R. Lance Farrar. 1999 "Applied Reservoir Engineering" (Oil & Gas Consultants International)

External links
 Society of Petroleum Engineers
Defining Reservoir Engineering

Engineering disciplines
Petroleum engineering